Adaline may refer to:

Film
The Age of Adaline, a 2015 film, alternative working title Adaline

Places
Adaline, West Virginia
 Adaline Hornbek Homestead, known as Hornbek House, Colorado, U.S.

People
 Adaline Hohf Beery (1859–1929), American writer
 Adaline Glasheen (1920–1993), author and scholar
 Adaline Kent (1900–1957), sculptor
 Adaline Shepherd (1883–1950), composer
 Adaline Emerson Thompson (1859-1951), American educational worker and reformer
 Adaline Weston Couzins (1815–1892), suffragist, American Civil War nurse
 Adaline, musician

Other uses
ADALINE, an artificial neural network